Mario Dolder (born 22 June 1990) is a Swiss former biathlete. He competed in the 2014/15 World Cup season, and represented Switzerland at the Biathlon World Championships 2015 in Kontiolahti.

References

External links 
 

1990 births
Living people
Swiss male biathletes
Biathletes at the 2018 Winter Olympics
Olympic biathletes of Switzerland